is a Japanese former professional racing cyclist.

Career
Born in Kirishima, Kagoshima, Nishizono attended Tokyo University, Japan's most elite university. While there in 2009, he won the Inter-College Championships. After graduation, he first joined , for which he won the first stage of the Tour de Hokkaido in 2011. For the 2013 season, he signed with UCI Professional Continental team .

In December 2013, Nishizono announced his retirement as a professional cyclist. He came out of retirement to join  for the 2015 season. In 2016 he regained his national time trial title. In 2017 he announced to retire again by the end of season.

Major results

2011
 National Road Championships
3rd Time trial
4th Road race
 8th Overall Tour de Hokkaido
1st Stage 1
2012
 1st  Time trial, National Road Championships
 2nd Overall Tour de Hokkaido
2013
 2nd Time trial, National Road Championships
 6th Overall Tour of Japan
2015
 3rd Time trial, National Road Championships
 5th Overall Tour de Hokkaido
2016
 National Road Championships
1st  Time trial
2nd Road race
 7th Tour de Okinawa
2017
 1st  Time trial, National Road Championships
 Asian Road Championships
2nd Team time trial
7th Individual time trial
 2nd Overall Tour de Hokkaido
 4th Overall Tour de Kumano

References

External links

1987 births
Living people
Japanese male cyclists
Sportspeople from Kagoshima Prefecture
University of Tokyo alumni